The 1980 Sonoma State Cossacks football team represented Sonoma State University as an independent during the 1980 NCAA Division III football season. This was the first year Sonoma State played intercollegiate football since they discontinued the program after the 1971 season. The team was led by head coach Milt Cerf. Cerf was an insurance broker, who had agreed to fund the program himself in 1979. Cerf led the 1979 "club" team to a 3–3 record against junior colleges and freshmen teams.

The 1980 Cossacks were again a club team. Sonoma State finished the season with a record of 6–4. The team outscored its opponents 275 to 195 for the season. The Cossacks played home games at Cossacks Stadium in Rohnert Park, California.

Schedule

Notes

References

Sonoma State
Sonoma State Cossacks football seasons
Sonoma State Cossacks football